Emil Zoraj (born 27 July 1978) is a Croatian Light heavyweight kickboxer fighting out of Zagreb, Croatia. In his career he was double WKA thaiboxing world champion, It's Showtime 75MAX trophy Tilburg tournament champion, WBC Muaythai intercontinental champion and OPBU Euro-African muaythai champion.

Career
He started training in 1993 only kickboxing, but also tried Savate and Full Contact. He started Muay Thai when he came to train with Branko Cikatić, and did it until then. He achieved good results in amateur competition, European gold and silver medalist with two bronze medals on World championships. He scored few knockout wins, with Marko Žaja, in Italy.

In 2001 he went in Netherlands to train with Andre Mannaart in Mejiro Gym. He made good progress, and participated in a gala tournament, scoring win over Sahin "Kaas" Yakut and losing in the final. He left Mejiro Gym after the rise of Remy Bonjasky, as he attracted all gym's attention.

Emil Zoraj first attracted worldwide attention making It's Showtime debut, winning It's Showtime 75 MAX Trophy Tilburg Pool B on December 12, 2005 in Tilburg, Netherlands. He defeated two Dutch fighters, Rayen Simson in semi finals and Sem Braan in final and qualified for It's Showtime 75MAX Trophy Final 2006 tournament.

On October 12, 2005 at Steko's Fight Night 17 he became World Kickboxing Association Thaiboxing world champion -83 kg defeating Jiri Bursa, next year also on Steko's Fight Night he won his third title and became World Kickboxing Association Thaiboxing world champion -76 kg defeating Adam Chajkin.

On September 23, 2006 he participated in an It's Showtime 75MAX Trophy Final 2006 tournament in Rotterdam, losing in quarter finals to Joerie Mes.

He won his fourth and fifth title on April 20, 2008 in Vienna, Austria defeating Otta Merling and becoming WBC Muaythai International Super Middleweight and OPBU Euro-African Muaythai Champion. Zoraj took the initiative since first round, earning a knockdown in second round with right cross and leaving a visible mark on Merling's head with an elbow in third.

He won bronze medal at IFMA 2009 World Muaythai Championships -75 kg category in December, 2009 defeating Remy Vectol in 1/8 finals and beating one of the best Muaythai fighters, Artem Levin bringing him one of very few career loses. He lost to tournament champion, Dmitry Valent by points, surviving nose injury in first round. He later suffered two amateur loses to Artem Levin.

Since winning WBC Muaythai and OPBU titles, Zoraj scored valuable victory against Myauthai legend Kaoklai Kaennorsing in Brno, Czech Republic and fought mostly in his homeland Croatia until 2010 when he decided to withdraw from the competition.

He returned to the fighting on March 15, 2012 in Zagreb, Croatia at K-1 World Grand Prix 2012 Final, where he was expected to fight Miran Fabjan then Giannis Sofokleus, but both were replaced and he fought Edmond Paltatzis. Zoraj's comeback was tough as he survived two knockdowns in first round, but achieved victory at the end of second round with a knee to the body of Paltatzis.

Later in the year he achieved victories at Final Fight Championship 4 over young Croatian prospect Zlatko Bajić and in Vienna on September 21, 2013 over Shkodran Veseli.

Titles
2008 WBC Muaythai International Super Middleweight (-76 kg/168 lb) Champion
2008 OPBU Euro-African Muaythai Champion -76 kg
2006 WKA Thaiboxing world champion -76 kg
2005 WKA Thaiboxing world champion -83 kg
2005 It's Showtime 75MAX Trophy Tilburg Pool B Champion
MTA European Champion
 3 x IMTA European Thaiboxing Champion

Fight record

See also

List of male kickboxers

References

Living people
Croatian male kickboxers
1978 births
Sportspeople from Zagreb
Place of birth missing (living people)
Croatian Muay Thai practitioners